Nardaran Fortress was built in 1301 by architect Mahmud ibn Sa'd in the northern part of Absheron Peninsula. Nardaran Fortress is located 25 km north of Baku in the village of Nardaran near the town of Mashtaga. Shirvanshahs used the fortress for both observation and defense. Nardaran Mosque or Rahimakhanim sanctuary which was built in 1663 is located about 200 m from the fortress.

An inscription on Nardaran fortress, which was translated by A.A.Alasgarzade, says:

But the geographical location of Nardaran Fortress indicates that there couldn't be a foremost defense. Similar fortresses were built there, from where it was expected to be attacked. Such regions were in the western borders and seashores of Absheron. But Nardaran Fortress was too far from the western borders of Absheron and also its seashores.

On October 24, 2001, Nardaran fortress was included on the UNESCO World Heritage Tentative List in Need of Urgent Safeguarding.

The construction of the Fortress 
The fortress is divided into three parts. The first part of the fortress is higher than the other parts. The thickness of the walls is ranging from 1,5 to 1,8 meters. A deep well is located on the first floor of the tower. In some sources it is noted that, the fortress was supplied with underground sewerage system.

Arabic inscriptions 
Above the entrance to the central tower, at the height of the second floor there are two inscriptions, carved out of stone. On the last inscription the name of the master who also built the old mosque and minaret in the village of Shikhov in the XIV century and a mosque in Baku called the Molla-Ahmed Mosque and the date of 1300 is shown.

Fortress architecture 
The height of the tower consists of three tiers, covered with flat stone dome vaults and connected by stone stairs. The fortress was made of white stones. The height of the tower is 12 meters high and the height of the walls that it's surrounded by is different. The fortress is located in the center of a square courtyard. There are also 4 corner towers with a barrier and loopholes.

References

Buildings and structures in Baku
Tourist attractions in Baku
Monuments and memorials in Azerbaijan
Castles and fortresses in Azerbaijan